Angus Creelman Ree (August 28, 1929 – October 9, 2009) was a lawyer and political figure in British Columbia. He represented North Vancouver-Capilano in the Legislative Assembly of British Columbia from 1979 to 1991 as a Social Credit member.

Biography 
He was born in Vancouver, British Columbia, the son of Alex Ree and Carolyn Eleanor Creelman, and was educated at the University of British Columbia. Ree served in the Canadian Army from 1952 to 1958. He was married twice, first to Anita Rose Schneeberger in 1957 and then to Cheri Ann Kingsland in 1973. Ree served in the provincial cabinet as the first Solicitor General of British Columbia.

References 

1929 births
2009 deaths
Politicians from Vancouver
British Columbia Social Credit Party MLAs
Canadian Army officers
Canadian King's Counsel
Corporate lawyers
Lawyers in British Columbia
Members of the Executive Council of British Columbia
Peter A. Allard School of Law alumni
20th-century Canadian politicians
Solicitors general of Canadian provinces